Jean-Marie Gantois (21 July 1904  – 28 May 1968) was a French Catholic priest (abbé) and a pioneer of Flemish nationalism in French Flanders.

Early life
Gantois was born in 1904 in Watten, Nord department, to Flemish parents. He was raised in the French language and learned Dutch at the Catholic seminary of Annappes where he began his studies in 1922. He was influenced by the Flemish circle of the seminary, which promoted the knowledge of Flemish culture, history and language for pastoral purposes. Gantois adopted the Flemish cause as his own and founded the short-lived paper De Vlaemsche Stemme van Vrankryk ("The Flemish Voice in France") in 1923 and the cultural association Vlaamsch Verbond van Frankrijk (VVF, "Flemish Association of France") in 1924.

In the 1920s and 1930s, Gantois wrote extensively for VVF journals and other publications using a number of pseudonyms. He also established personal contacts with numerous other regional leaders of France. At first, Gantois supported French Flanders remaining a part of the French state, insofar as France recognized and respected his region. However, the VVF gradually became more separatist in its politics, and over time abandoned French regionalism as its ideology and increasingly associated with the Greater Netherlands movement, which considered the French Flemish as a part of a single Dutch race, the Dietse volk.

Activities during World War II
Early during the war, French military authorities banned the VVF. During the German occupation, Gantois revived the activities of the VVF. In 1940 he wrote a letter to Hitler asking for French Flanders to be integrated into the German Reich "as a member of the new germanic community". This letter, found back at the Lille préfecture de Lille after the Liberation, was never read by Hitler. Because of his vocal Flemish nationalism and perceived extremism, Gantois was relieved of his sacramental duties by Cardinal Achille Liénart.

Post-war
After the end of the German occupation, Gantois and 49 other individuals involved in the French Flemish movement were arrested by the French authorities and charged with collaborationism. The prosecution requested a death penalty, but Gantois was eventually sentenced to five years in prison. He was released after two years of confinement and was forbidden to return to Flanders for many years. Gantois continued promoting Flemish nationalism by writing, mainly for the magazine Notre Flandre ("Our Flanders"), until his death in Holque, Nord in 1968.

References
Citations

Bibliography
 
 
 

1904 births
1968 deaths
20th-century French Roman Catholic priests
People from Nord (French department)
Flemish priests